Shandongzhuang Town is a town in the center of Pinggu District, Beijing, China. On the northeastern corner of Pinggu's urbanized area, It borders Xiong'erzhai Township to its north, Nandulehe Town to its east, Xiagezhuang Town to is south, as well as Xinggu Subdistrict and Wangxinzhuang Town to its west. In the year 2020, It was home to 16,315 residents. The name Shandongzhuang can be translated as "Villa East of Mountains"

History

Administrative divisions 
At the time of writing, Shandongzhuang Town consists of 13 subdivisions, with 1 community and 12 villages,  which are listed as follows:

See also 

 List of township-level divisions of Beijing

References 

Pinggu District
Towns in Beijing